"Drive" is a song by American rock band Incubus, released on November 14, 2000, as the third single from their third album, Make Yourself (1999). It is the band's biggest hit and breakthrough single, eventually reaching the top of the US Billboard Modern Rock Tracks chart on March 3, 2001, and number nine on the Billboard Hot 100 on July 28. It also reached number four in Portugal, number 13 in New Zealand, number 34 in Australia, and number 40 in the United Kingdom. In 2001, "Drive" won a Billboard Award for Modern Rock Single of the Year. Director Bill Draheim documented the making of "Drive" in Save Me from My Half-Life Drive.

Content
According to lead singer Brandon Boyd, "The lyric is basically about fear, about being driven all your life by it and making decisions from fear. It's about imagining what life would be like if you didn't live it that way".

Music video
Directed by Phil Harder and based on M.C. Escher's Drawing Hands, the music video features a simple musical session intercut with a rotoscoped animation of Brandon Boyd drawing himself, which was handled by both Boyd and drummer Jose Pasillas. The non-animated scenes were shot in the McNamara Alumni Center on the University of Minnesota. The video was nominated for Best Group Video at the 2001 MTV Video Music Awards but lost to 'N Sync.

Track listings

US CD single
 "Drive" (album version) – 3:52
 "Drive" (orchestral studio version) – 3:55

Australian maxi-CD single
 "Drive" – 3:52
 "Crowded Elevator" – 4:44
 "Stellar" (acoustic) – 3:16
 "Pardon Me" (acoustic) – 3:46
 "Drive" (acoustic) – 3:52

UK CD single
 "Drive"
 "Drive" (acoustic)
 "Clean" (live)
 "Drive" (video)

UK 7-inch EP
A1. "Drive" (live orchestral version) – 4:05
B1. "Favourite Things" (live) – 3:45
B2. "Pardon Me" (live) – 4:18

European CD1
 "Drive" (album version) – 3:52
 "Pardon Me" (live) – 4:18

European CD2
 "Drive" (album version) – 3:52
 "Drive" (orchestral studio version) – 3:55
 "Favorite Things" (live) – 3:45
 "Pardon Me" (live) – 4:18
 "Clean" (live)

Credits and personnel
Credits are taken from the European CD2 liner notes.

Studios
 Recorded at NRG Recording Studios (North Hollywood, Los Angeles)
 Mastered at A&M Studios (Hollywood, California, US)

Incubus
 Incubus – production
 Brandon Boyd – writing
 Mike Einziger – writing
 Dirk Lance – writing
 Chris Kilmore – writing
 José Pasillas – writing

Additional musicians
 Dave Holdridge – cello, digital editing

Other personnel
 Scott Litt – production, mixing
 Rick Will – mixing
 Michael "Elvis" Baskette – engineering
 Matt Griffin – assistant engineering
 Evan Hollander – assistant engineering
 Stephen Marcussen – mastering
 Brandy Flower – design
 Danny Clinch – photography

Charts

Weekly charts

Year-end charts

Certifications

Release history

References

External links
 Website of the animated short film 'I move so I am' (The Netherlands, 1997) of animator Gerrit van Dijk on which the official music video "Drive" was based.

1999 songs
2000 singles
Epic Records singles
Immortal Records singles
Incubus (band) songs
Music videos directed by Phil Harder
Song recordings produced by Scott Litt
Songs about cars
Songs written by Alex Katunich
Songs written by Brandon Boyd
Songs written by Chris Kilmore
Songs written by José Pasillas
Songs written by Mike Einziger
Songs about anxiety